Nyanaberi Forest Park  is a forest park in the Gambia. Established on January 1, 1954, it covers 1198 hectares.

It is located in Lower River, Gambia. The estimate terrain elevation above sea level is 32 metres.

References

Protected areas established in 1954
Forest parks of the Gambia